The Slovenia national football team has appeared at the FIFA World Cup on two occasions, in 2002 and 2010. The team was eliminated in the group stage on both occasions. Their first and, to date, the only World Cup victory came in 2010, when Slovenia defeated Algeria 1–0 with a goal by Robert Koren.

World Cup record
From 1930 to 1990, Slovenia did not compete at the World Cup as the country was part of Yugoslavia. Since their independence in 1991, Slovenia have qualified for two World Cups and was eliminated in the group stage on both occasions.

2002 FIFA World Cup 
Slovenia qualified for their first World Cup in 2002 under the management of Srečko Katanec. They suffered a 3–1 defeat to Spain in their opening game. Katanec's decision to substitute midfielder Zlatko Zahovič led to an argument that ended with Zahovič being expelled from the team and sent home, and Katanec announced his intention to resign as manager after the tournament. Slovenia lost their second game 1–0 to South Africa, leaving them unable to qualify from the group. The side's final game ended in a 3–1 defeat to Paraguay.

Group B

2010 FIFA World Cup 
Slovenia were the smallest country in terms of population to qualify for the 2010 World Cup. Under the management of Matjaž Kek, the team qualified for the tournament by winning the two-legged playoff against Russia, despite losing the first leg. Slovenia beat Algeria 1–0 in their opening game, securing their first ever World Cup victory, and drew 2–2 with the United States. This meant that the side only needed a draw in their final group game against England to reach the knockout stage. However, a 1–0 loss to England and a United States victory over Algeria saw Slovenia finish third in the group and fail to advance.

Group C

Player records

Most appearances
Slovenia's 2010 squad did not feature a single player from the 2002 tournament, so no player had the chance to play more than three World Cup matches for Slovenia.

Goalscorers
Five Slovenian players scored one goal each at FIFA World Cups.

References

 
Countries at the FIFA World Cup
World Cup